Bokutachi wa, Ano Hi no Yoake wo Shitteiru is the ninth studio album by Japanese idol group AKB48. It was released on January 24, 2018. The album features the previously released singles "Shoot Sign", "Negaigoto no Mochigusare", "#Sukinanda" and "11gatsu no Anklet". The album was released in three versions (Type A, Type B and Theater Edition) and Nana Okada was announced as the center for this album.

Track listing

Personnel 
Graduated members
 Mayu Watanabe 
 Haruna Kojima 
 Yuria Kizaki 
 Haruka Shimada 
Guests (on track 2)
 Marika Ito (Nogizaka46)
 Asuka Saito (Nogizaka46)
 Minami Hoshino (Nogizaka46)
 Hinako Kitano (Nogizaka46)
 Ranze Terade (Nogizaka46)
 Miona Hori (Nogizaka46)
 Yui Imaizumi (Keyakizaka46)
 Yūka Sugai (Keyakizaka46)
 Yurina Hirate (Keyakizaka46)
 Rika Watanabe (Keyakizaka46)
 Risa Watanabe (Keyakizaka46)
 Neru Nagahama (Keyakizaka46)

Release history

References 

AKB48 albums
2018 albums